The 1975 NCAA Men's Water Polo Championship was the seventh annual NCAA Men's Water Polo Championship to determine the national champion of NCAA men's college water polo. Tournament matches were played at the Belmont Plaza Pool in Long Beach, California during December 1975.

California defeated UC Irvine in the final, 9–8, to win their third national title. This was a rematch of the previous two years' finals, both won by California.

The leading scorer for the tournament was Gary Figueroa from UC Irvine (13 goals). Jon Svendsen, from California, was named the Most Outstanding Player. An All-Tournament Team, consisting of eight players, was also named.

Qualification
Since there has only ever been one single national championship for water polo, all NCAA men's water polo programs (whether from Division I, Division II, or Division III) were eligible. A total of 8 teams were invited to contest this championship.

Bracket
Site: Belmont Plaza Pool, Long Beach, California

{{8TeamBracket-Consols
| team-width=150
| RD3=First round
| RD4=Championship semifinals
| RD2=Consolation semifinals
| RD5=Championship
| RD5b=Third place
| RD1=Fifth place
| RD1b=Seventh place

| RD3-seed1= | RD3-team1=UCLA | RD3-score1=26
| RD3-seed2= | RD3-team2=Army | RD3-score2=2
| RD3-seed3= | RD3-team3=California  | RD3-score3=9
| RD3-seed4= | RD3-team4=Long Beach State | RD3-score4=6
| RD3-seed5= | RD3-team5=Stanford | RD3-score5=15
| RD3-seed6= | RD3-team6=Arizona | RD3-score6=3
| RD3-seed7= | RD3-team7=UC Irvine | RD3-score7=19| RD3-seed8= | RD3-team8=UC Davis | RD3-score8=4

| RD4-seed1= | RD4-team1=UCLA | RD4-score1=9
| RD4-seed2= | RD4-team2=California | RD4-score2=13| RD4-seed3= | RD4-team3=Stanford | RD4-score3=8
| RD4-seed4= | RD4-team4=UC Irvine | RD4-score4=9

| RD2-seed1= | RD2-team1=Army | RD2-score1=0
| RD2-seed2= | RD2-team2=Long Beach State | RD2-score2=18| RD2-seed3= | RD2-team3=Arizona | RD2-score3=9| RD2-seed4= | RD2-team4=UC Davis | RD2-score4=8

| RD5-seed1= | RD5-team1=California | RD5-score1=9| RD5-seed2= | RD5-team2=UC Irvine | RD5-score2=8

| RD5b-seed1= | RD5b-team1=UCLA | RD5b-score1=6| RD5b-seed2= | RD5b-team2=Stanford | RD5b-score2=5

| RD1-seed1= | RD1-team1=Long Beach State | RD1-score1=13
| RD1-seed2= | RD1-team2=Arizona| RD1-score2=6

| RD1b-seed1= | RD1b-team1=Army | RD1b-score1=3
| RD1b-seed2= | RD1b-team2=UC Davis | RD1b-score2=20}}

 All-tournament team Jon Svendsen, California (Most outstanding player)'''
Guy Antley, UC Irvine
Tom Belfanti, California
Walter Bricker, California
Gary Figueroa, UC Irvine
Boyd Philpot, UC Irvine
John Stephens, UCLA
Joe Vargas, UCLA

See also 
 NCAA Men's Water Polo Championship

References

NCAA Men's Water Polo Championship
NCAA Men's Water Polo Championship
1975 in sports in California
December 1975 sports events in the United States
1975